James Ward (March 2, 1855 – June 4, 1886) was a catcher in Major League Baseball who played for the Philadelphia Athletics in its 1876 season.

Ward was born and died in Boston, Massachusetts.

External links

1855 births
1886 deaths
19th-century baseball players
Baseball players from Boston
Major League Baseball catchers
Philadelphia Athletics (NL) players
19th-century deaths from tuberculosis
Tuberculosis deaths in Massachusetts